Leinster League Division Three is the third division of the Leinster League and started in the 1994/95 season.

The number of teams was reduced from 14 to 13 in 2007/2008, and again from 13 to 9 in 2008/2009.

History 
Ashbourne, Barnhall, Birr, Coolmine, CYM, Delvin, New Ross, Old Kilcullen, Railway Union, Tullow and Wicklow entered the division through the qualifying matches in the 1993/1994 season.

Old Kilcullen later amalgamated with Curragh RFC to form Newbridge and Delvin with Drogheda RFC to form Boyne.

2008/2009 Season 
Athy
Balbriggan
Birr
CYM
Malahide
North Kildare
Railway Union
Swords
Wexford Wanderers

2008/2009 Table

2007/2008 Season 
 Arklow
 Athy
 Balbriggan
 Birr
 Clane
 Clondalkin
 CYM
 Gorey
 Malahide
 North Kildare
 Rathdrum
 Swords
 Wexford Wanderers

At the end of the season, Arklow, Clane, Clondalkin and Gorey were promoted to Division Two, with Railway Union being relegated from Division Two.

2007/2008 Table

2006/2007 Season 
 Arklow
 Athboy
 Balbriggan
 Birr
 Clane
 Clondalkin
 CYM
 Gorey
 Longford
 Malahide
 Rathdrum
 Swords
 Tullow
 Wexford Wanderers

At the end of the season, Tullow and Longford were promoted to Division Two. Athboy went to play in the Magee Cup (North East Junior 3).

2006/2007 Table

Past winners 

1994/1995 CYM

1995/1996 Railway Union

1996/1997 Malahide

1997/1998 Wicklow

1998/1999 Aer Lingus

1999/2000 Portarlington

2000/2001 Seapoint

2001/2002 New Ross

2002/2003 Cill Dara

2003/2004 Rathdrum

2004/2005 Newbridge

2005/2006 North Kildare

2006/2007 Tullow

2007/2008 Rathdrum

Wins by club

 Rathdrum (twice)
 CYM (once)
 Railway Union (once)
 Malahide (once)
 Wicklow (once)
 Aer Lingus - now Swords (once)
 Portarlington (once)
 Seapoint (once)
 New Ross (once)
 Cill Dara (once)
 Newbridge (once)
 North Kildare (once)
 Tullow (once)

External links
Leinster Rugby : Leinster League History: Division Three
Leinster League Division Three 2008/2009
Leinster League Division Three 2007/2008
Leinster League Division Three 2006/2007

Leinster League